Idylls from Messina is a set of eight idylls composed by Friedrich Nietzsche. These poems were written in Sicily during the spring of 1882, where Nietzsche remained for three weeks after arriving from Genoa.

In May 1882, those eight idylls were published in Internationale Monatschrift by Ernst Schmeitzner, Nietzsche's publisher at the time, with whom he would later sever all ties and whom he will eventually sue. They stem from the same voluminous amount of poetic attempts he took upon himself from February to April 1882, from which Nietzsche later composed his Vorspiel in deutschen Reimen to Die fröhliche Wissenschaft in 1882. From these eight poems, Nietzsche used six, in marginally modified form, for the Lieder des Prinzen Vogelfrei, the appendix for the second edition of Die fröhliche Wissenschaft in 1887.

References
 Kaufmann, Sebastian: Kommentar zu Nietzsches Idyllen aus Messina, in: Historischer und kritischer Kommentar zu Friedrich Nietzsches Werken, hg. von der Heidelberger Akademie der Wissenschaften (Nietzsche-Kommentar), Bd. 3/1, Berlin / Boston 2015, S. 457-543. (Review: Hermann Josef Schmidt, Nietzsches Morgenröthe und Idyllen aus Messina, umfassend und kritisch kommentiert. Ein faszinierendes, wohlbelegtes, überfälliges, Diskussionen provozierendes Wagnis: Historischer und kritischer Kommentar zu Friedrich Nietzsches Werken, Bd. 3/1, vorgestellt, diskutiert, aus genetischer Perspektive ergänzt und mit prinzipielleren Bemerkungen zur Nietzscheinterpretation garniert. Teil II: „Ich möchte eine Lerche sein“. Die Idyllen aus Messina, kommentiert von Sebastian Kaufmann, im Kontext der Entwicklung von Nietzsches Lyrik – eine subversive Agentin seiner moralkritischen Philosophie?.

1882 poems
Messina
Poetry by Friedrich Nietzsche